Matthew Ronald Fry (born 26 September 1990) is an English former professional footballer who played as a defender. He played for West Ham United, Gillingham, Charlton Athletic, Bradford City, Concord Rangers, Dartford, Chelmsford City, Eastleigh Braintree Town, York City and Herne Bay.

Career

Early career
Fry was born in Longfield, Kent. He is a product of Gravesend & Northfleet's youth team. Aged eleven he joined West Ham United's youth team, and captained the under-18 team in the 2008–09 season, before signing his first professional contract in June 2009.

He signed for League One club Gillingham on a one-month loan on 15 October 2009. He made his debut on 17 October 2009, in a 2–0 away defeat against Milton Keynes Dons. In November 2009, his loan with Gillingham was extended for a further month, and in December extended again for another month. Fry suffered a knee injury in Gillingham's away match against Exeter City on 28 December 2009, ruling him out of action for six weeks. On 7 January 2010, he returned to West Ham.

On 25 March 2010, he signed for League One club Charlton Athletic until the end of the season, but returned to West Ham without having played for Charlton due to a persisting knee problem suffered earlier in the year. On 5 August 2010, Fry again joined Charlton on loan, this time until January 2011. On 28 August 2010, Fry made his first appearance for Charlton and scored his first goal, in a 3–1 away defeat to Huddersfield Town. On 22 March 2011, Fry returned to West Ham having made 32 appearances, scoring one goal, for Charlton.

Fry had his contract cancelled by mutual consent with West Ham on 2 February 2012 allowing him to seek first-team football on a regular basis.

Bradford City
On 10 February 2012, Fry joined League Two club Bradford City on a free transfer. He made his debut in a 1–1 draw at home to Port Vale on 14 February 2012, in which he played 79 minutes before being substituted.

Concord Rangers
After leaving Bradford, Fry played for Concord Rangers, helping them win promotion from the Isthmian League Premier Division to the Conference South in 2012–13 via the play-offs. In May 2013, Fry played for Concord against Lowestoft Town in the play-off final at Crown Meadow, with Concord winning 2–1 to gain promotion.

Dartford, Concord, Braintree
In June 2013, Fry signed for Dartford, but returned to Concord in March 2014 having made 15 appearances. In June 2015, he signed for Braintree Town.

York City
Fry signed for newly relegated National League club York City on 16 June 2016 on a two-year contract. His contract with York was cancelled by mutual consent on 26 September 2017 to retire from full-time football on medical advice.

Herne Bay
Fry signed for Isthmian League South East Division club Herne Bay on 20 July 2018.

Career statistics

Honours
Concord Rangers
Isthmian League Premier Division play-offs: 2013

References

External links

Profile at the Herne Bay F.C. website

1990 births
Living people
People from Longfield
Footballers from Kent
English footballers
Association football defenders
Ebbsfleet United F.C. players
West Ham United F.C. players
Gillingham F.C. players
Charlton Athletic F.C. players
Bradford City A.F.C. players
Concord Rangers F.C. players
Dartford F.C. players
Chelmsford City F.C. players
Eastleigh F.C. players
Braintree Town F.C. players
York City F.C. players
Herne Bay F.C. players
English Football League players
Isthmian League players
National League (English football) players